Akira Nakai is a Japanese car tuner, founder of Porsche tuning company RAUH-Welt BEGRIFF (RWB), which specializes in the design and installation of custom wide-body kits for classic Porsche models. Earlier examples sported a sticker "Sekund Entwicklung" on the back which was later changed to "Zweite Entwicklung" (meaning "second development") to fix a German language mistake.

Life and career

Spark of interest 
Nakai's career got started with a drift crew called Rough World, working on a Trueno AE86, stretching the limits of what the car could bear, whilst drinking his preferred beer, Stella Artois. He started to work on Porsches while employed by a body shop when he came across a damaged Porsche 930, which he bought off its original owner, with it later becoming the first RWB Porsche, named 'Stella Artois' after his preferred beer in the late 90s. This spark of interest, along with a little personal touch, is what led Nakai to create his Stella Artois inspired Porsche and many similar projects.

Company 
Nakai later started his own company called RAUH Welt BEGRIFF (RWB) and became known for modifying Porsches, giving them sometimes extreme body conversions. His usual modifications include a new front bumper, rear bumper, side skirts, wheel arches and spoilers. He offers additional options such as new fenders of various width, suspension adjustments and smaller aesthetic additions, like canards and special rivets. The track width of the "RWB" Porsches is often widened. Nakai's and his company's modifications are said to have reached a "cult status" and his aesthetics are described as "singular".

Tribute 
People that admire both cars and video games were pleased when Nakai-san was featured both in game as well as in live-action cutscenes as the "Build Icon", an idol for other characters and the player himself to follow the footsteps regarding car customization and tuning in the 2015 video game Need for Speed. The widebody kits designed and created by him were available for players to use on select Porsche models and his "Stella Artois" custom Porsche 911 Turbo can be earned in game.

References 

Living people
Auto tuning companies
Year of birth missing (living people)